There have been fourteen recorded sieges of Gibraltar. Its position just across the eponymous Strait from Morocco in North Africa, as well as its natural defensibility, have made it one of the most fought-over places in Europe.

Only five of the sieges resulted in a change of rule. Seven were fought between Muslims and Catholics during Muslim rule, four between Spain and Britain from the Anglo-Dutch capture in 1704 to the end of the Great Siege in 1783, two between rival Catholic factions, and one between rival Muslim powers. Four of Gibraltar's changes in rule, including three sieges, took place over a matter of days or hours, whereas several other sieges had durations of months or years and claimed the lives of thousands without resulting in any change in rule.

Background

Gibraltar is a British territory and mountainous peninsula on the far southern coast of the Iberian peninsula, at one of the narrowest points in the Mediterranean, only  from the coast of Morocco in North Africa. A narrow, low-lying isthmus connects the peninsula to the Spanish mainland. High coastal cliffs and a rocky shoreline make it virtually impossible to attack from the east or south. The west side – occupied by the town of Gibraltar, which stands at the base of the Rock – and the northern approach across the isthmus have been densely fortified by its various occupants with numerous walls, towers and gun batteries. The geography of the peninsula provides considerable natural defensive advantages, which combined with its location have imbued Gibraltar with enormous military significance over the centuries.

The first documented invasion of Gibraltar was by the Moors, Muslim Arabs and Berbers who arrived from North Africa at the beginning of the eighth century. They used the area as a base from which to launch an invasion of the rest of the Iberian Peninsula which resulted in most of Iberia coming under Moorish rule. The Spanish Reconquista began later in the eighth century. The campaign eventually took 800 years to force the Moors back across the Strait, and did not reach the Bay of Gibraltar until the fourteenth century. It was not until 1309, nearly 600 years after Gibraltar was first settled, that the first siege of Gibraltar was recorded. King Ferdinand I of Castile began a siege of Algeciras on the other side of the bay in July, but his naval blockade was unable to stop supplies being smuggled in small boats from Gibraltar to the besieged city. He sent an army under Alonso Pérez de Guzmán to take Gibraltar. De Guzmán succeeded after a month-long siege, and Gibraltar was settled by the Castilians for the first time. Six years later, the Moors attempted to retake the peninsula in the brief second siege which was abandoned at the sight of a Castilian relief force. Another Moorish attempt eventually succeeded in the third siege of February–June 1333. A Castilian attempt to retake it in the fourth siege of June–August 1333 failed, as did the fifth siege of 1349–50, in which King Alfonso XI of Castile died in an outbreak of bubonic plague among the besiegers. The Moors of Granada and Fez fell out with each other over Gibraltar in 1411, leading to the Granadans besieging the fortified town in the sixth siege and seizing it from the Marinids of Fez. Enrique Pérez de Guzmán, 2nd Count de Niebla made a failed attempt to capture Gibraltar in the seventh siege of 1436, during which he perished.

The Moorish presence in Gibraltar ended in 1462, when Enrique's son Juan Alonso de Guzmán, 1st Duke of Medina Sidonia captured it after the eighth siege. What followed was a bitter dispute over the rights to the fortress. The Duke of Medina Sidonia claimed Gibraltar as his own, making a mortal enemy of Juan Ponce de León, Count of Arcos, but Henry IV of Castile declared it crown property shortly afterwards and so began a civil war. Henry was deposed in effigy in 1465 by a council of nobles who proclaimed as king his half-brother Alfonso. Gibraltar's ninth siege took place after Medina Sidonia persuaded Alfonso to grant him the fortress, following which the Duke sent an army to storm the town. Henry's governor held out for fifteen months before finally surrendering in July 1467. Medina Sidonia's grandson, the third duke Juan Alfonso Pérez de Guzmán, was responsible for Gibraltar's tenth siege (and, as it happened, its last for 200 years). Queen Isabella I again declared Gibraltar crown property in 1501, but her death three years later left Castile in turmoil, prompting Medina Sidonia to take advantage of the kingdom's weakness. He assembled an army and marched on Gibraltar in the hope that the city would simply open its gates to him, but it did not, forcing him to lay siege to it instead; he abandoned the attempt after three months.

Gibraltar lived in relative peace for over 200 years after the tenth siege, by which time the Reconquista was completed and Spain was unified under a single crown. The Rock's importance as a fortress diminished and its defences were neglected. The next siege came in 1704, during the War of the Spanish Succession. The Confederate nations (led by England and the Dutch Republic in opposition to the Bourbons of the Spanish and French thrones) were seeking to gain a foothold in the Mediterranean, largely to distract the attentions of the Franco-Spanish Bourbon dynasty from a land campaign in northern Europe. Gibraltar was chosen as the target after unsuccessful attempts on other ports. The Confederates attacked on 1 August 1704 and the Spanish governor Diego de Salinas surrendered after the eleventh siege, which only lasted three days. Within a few weeks, Spanish forces began assembling to the north of Gibraltar (now La Línea de la Concepción) for an attempt to re-take the fortress. After the twelfth siege, which comprised a six-month bombardment and blockade from the isthmus linking Gibraltar to the mainland, the garrison was no closer to surrendering and the Franco-Spanish army abandoned the siege. The War of the Spanish Succession formally ended in 1713 with the signing of the Treaty of Utrecht, under which Gibraltar was ceded to Great Britain. It was initially assumed that Britain would not permanently retain Gibraltar, and would eventually trade it for something else, but the strength of British public opinion made it politically impossible to use the territory as a bargaining chip. Spain, meanwhile, felt betrayed by the French, who had negotiated the Treaty of Utrecht unilaterally, and was determined to regain Gibraltar. The issue came to a head in 1727 when King Philip V of Spain claimed that the British had voided Article X of the treaty, under which Gibraltar had been ceded, due to failures to adhere to its conditions. Philip's forces began the thirteenth siege from the isthmus on 22 February, but after four months, the Spanish supply chain could not keep up with the demands of the siege and, lacking a navy, Spain was unable to prevent Britain from resupplying the garrison by sea.

In the years following the thirteenth siege, tensions began to resurface between Britain and France, and Spain remained neutral in a series of wars waged over the two nations' rival ambitions. The Treaty of Utrecht was reaffirmed by a succession of treaties, but Spain remained determined to regain the territory she had lost. In addition to her struggles with France, Britain also struggled with her North American colonies, which culminated in the American War of Independence that began in 1775; four years later, Spain declared war on Britain, primarily in an attempt to win back Gibraltar. Spain broke off communications with Gibraltar in June, beginning the fourteenth and final siege—the "Great Siege of Gibraltar"—although the first shot of the siege was not fired until 12 September. Throughout the siege, the Spanish attempted to starve the garrison into submission by blockading the isthmus and bribing the Sultan of Morocco into cutting off supplies while bombarding the town and its fortifications. The Great Siege was noteworthy for the efforts of engineers on both sides to gain advantage through the adoption of novel technologies, such as the Spanish floating batteries and the British depressing carriages to allow cannon to fire downwards from the Rock of Gibraltar. The siege ended in a humiliating failure for Spain, as all attempts made on Gibraltar were repulsed with 6,000 killed and all floating batteries destroyed. Britain retained Gibraltar but ceded East and West Florida and Menorca.

Gibraltar played an important role in the Napoleonic Wars in the late eighteenth and early nineteenth centuries and in many later conflicts. Hitler drew up plans to besiege Gibraltar during the Second World War (Operation Felix), but the plans were never implemented and the Great Siege was the last military siege of Gibraltar. Some historians discuss the closure of the Gibraltar–Spain border (part of an attempt by Spain to coerce the United Kingdom into ceding Gibraltar) from 1969 to 1985 as a "fifteenth siege"; as this differs from the other fourteen sieges in that it was not a conflict between opposing militaries, it is not included in this list.

List of sieges

See also

 History of Gibraltar
 Timeline of the history of Gibraltar

References
General

 
 
 
 
 

Specific

sieges
 
Sieges